Syncephalum is a genus of flowering plants in the pussy's-toes tribe within the daisy family.

Species
The only known species is Syncephalum arbutifolium, native to Madagascar.

References

Monotypic Asteraceae genera
Gnaphalieae
Endemic flora of Madagascar